Donald Bruce McCormick (born 1932) is an American biochemist who researched nutrition. His research focused on vitamins that were soluble in water and the processes of metabolism. He was recognized with a Guggenheim Fellowship and fellowship in the American Association for the Advancement of Sciences in 1966; he was editor of the Annual Review of Nutrition for ten years.

Early life and education 
Donald Bruce McCormick was born in 1932 in Front Royal, Virginia to parents Elizabeth  and Jesse A. McCormick. His older siblings were James, Mary, and Edward, with younger sibling William. His father was a high school teacher who taught chemistry and biology and was also involved in the production of explosives like TNT.  His family later moved to Tennessee and he attended high school in Oak Ridge, Tennessee. In 1950 he won second place in the Westinghouse Science Talent Search for high school seniors. He attended Vanderbilt University, graduating with a bachelor's degree in chemistry in 1953 and a PhD under the advisorship of Oscar Touster in 1958. His doctoral thesis was about the metabolism of glucuronic acid, ribitol, and xylulose. He then completed a postdoctoral appointment with Esmond Emerson Snell at the University of California, Berkeley where he researched the metabolism of vitamin B6 and pyridoxal kinases.

Career 
McCormick's research mostly focused on water-soluble vitamins and metabolism. In 1960 he became an assistant professor at Cornell University; he was promoted in 1963 to associate professor and 1969 to professor. From 1979 to 1994 he was the chair of the department of biochemistry at Emory University. He retired from Emory in 1997, at which point he became a professor emeritus. He succeeded Robert E. Olson as the editor of the Annual Review of Nutrition in 1995, holding the position through 2004.

Awards and honors 
He was awarded a Guggenheim Fellowship in 1966 in the molecular and cellular biology division. Also in 1966 he was elected a fellow of the American Association for the Advancement of Science. He is additionally a fellow of the American Institute of Chemists and served as president of the American Institute of Nutrition in 1991.

Personal life 
In 1955 he married Norma Jean . They have three children.

References

External links 

 A Conversation with Donald B. McCormick: 40 minute interview with McCormick about his career for the Annual Review of Nutrition (2012)

Living people
1932 births
People from Front Royal, Virginia
People from Oak Ridge, Tennessee
Vanderbilt University alumni
Cornell University faculty
Fellows of the American Association for the Advancement of Science
Emory University faculty
American biochemists
American nutritionists
Annual Reviews (publisher) editors